Antoine Rater (26 April 1729 in Lyon – 4 August 1794 in Miribel) was a French architect.

Honours 

There is a street called Montée Rater at Lyon, France.

References 

1729 births
1794 deaths
18th-century French architects
Architects from Lyon